Turkish incursion into northern Iraq may refer to one of the following:

 August 1986 Turkish incursion into northern Iraq
 March 1987 Turkish incursion into northern Iraq
 December 2007 Turkish incursion into northern Iraq
 2008 Turkish incursion into northern Iraq
 March 2016 Turkish incursion into northern Iraq